Wallace Humphrey White Jr. (August 6, 1877March 31, 1952) was an American politician and Republican leader in the United States Congress from 1917 until 1949. White was from the U.S. state of Maine and served in the U.S. House of Representatives before being elected to the U.S. Senate, where he was Senate Minority Leader and later Majority Leader before his retirement.

Background
White was born in Lewiston, Maine. His grandfather, William P. Frye, was also a prominent political figure, having served as a Senator from Maine and President pro tempore. In 1899, White graduated from Bowdoin College in Brunswick. After graduating, he became the assistant clerk to the Senate Committee on Commerce and later secretary to his grandfather. White studied law and was admitted to the bar, afterward beginning to practice in Lewiston.

Career
The political career of White began when he was elected as a Republican to the U.S. House of Representatives in 1916. He took office on March 4 of the following year and served until March 3, 1931 (65th–71st Congresses). He left the House in 1931 after being elected to the Senate in late 1930.

In Congress, White served as chairman of the House Committee on Expenditures in the Department of Justice (66th Congress), the House Committee on Woman Suffrage (67th through 69th Congresses), the House Committee on Merchant Marine and Fisheries (70th and 71st Congresses), and the Senate Committee on Interstate and Foreign Commerce (80th Congress). He also served as a presidential appointee on a variety of commissions.

White was reelected in 1936 and 1942 and served from March 4, 1931, to January 3, 1949. He was elected minority leader by his colleagues (1944–1947), and became majority leader when his party held a majority in the 80th Congress (1947–1949). According to John Gunther's 1947 book Inside U.S.A., as the titular party floor leader, "his chief function is to hold the balance between two much more dominant and vivid men, Taft and Vandenberg...Everybody likes White; few people pay much attention to him."

White was one of a handful of senators who voted against the elevation of Hugo Black to the Supreme Court in 1937 based on his previous Klan membership.

He was not a candidate for renomination in 1948. In 1952, White died in Auburn and is interred at the Mt. Auburn Cemetery.

Family
White was married twice, first to Anna Pratt of Lewiston in 1903.  A one son, Herbert Frye White, was born in 1904.  In 1914, Anna Pratt White and an infant daughter Helen Hayden White both died in childbirth. In 1917 White married widow Nina Lumbard Lunn. Nina Lunn was the widow of Ralph Lunn and she brought to the marriage a son, Richard Lunn and daughter, Nina Katherine Lunn.

References

External links

|-

|-

|-

|-

|-

|-

|-

|-

|-

|-

1877 births
1952 deaths
American Congregationalists
Bowdoin College alumni
Maine lawyers
Politicians from Lewiston, Maine
Republican Party members of the United States House of Representatives from Maine
Republican Party United States senators from Maine